Oscar William Holm Jr. (March 24, 1925 – December 16, 2020) was an American art historian and author, focused on Indigenous Northwest Coast art. He created artworks and taught Northwest Coast style, including formline design. He was Professor Emeritus of Art History, and Curator Emeritus of Northwest Coast Indian Art at the Burke Museum of Natural History and Culture and occasionally lectured at the University of Washington in Seattle.

Holm's 1965 book Northwest Coast Indian Art: An Analysis of Form has for decades been the standard introductory text in the field. In its 18th printing, the 50th-anniversary edition, with new commentary, was published in 2014.

Background 
Holm was born on March 24, 1925, in Roundup, Montana to electrician Oscar Holm and teacher Martha Holm. His family moved to Seattle, Washington when Holm was twelve. Prior to his career as an artist and art historian, Holm was enlisted in the army and served in as part of a field artillery observation battalion in France during World War II. He would go on to earn the rank of Master sergeant.

In 1953 Holm married his wife Marty (née Mueller), a dancer. British Columbia Provincial judge Alfred Scow, a Kwakwaka'wakw elder, said "[Bill Holm] has been a respectful student of our tradition, who took pains to learn Kwakwala. He is a very thorough art historian."

In 1942 Holm worked at Henderson Camp, later renamed Camp Nor'wester, a summer camp located in the San Juan Islands of Washington state. Here he and his wife Marty struck up a friendship with Mungo Martin, which led to significant artistic accomplishments including the recording of hundreds of Kwakwaka'wakw songs, the construction of "big houses" and totem poles on Lopez Island and John's Island, many dance masks, four Haida-style canoes, and more. Martin would give Holm the names Namsgamuti (He Speaks Only Once), Hamtsi'stesalagalis (Unrestrained Hamatsa Everywhere), Ho'miskanis (Plenty of Everything, literally, Surplus Food from the River). Holm was also named Tlalelitla (Continually Inviting) by Chief William Scow, Henry Bell, and Joe Seaweed.

His students included the Haida carver Freda Diesing and many others.

Honors 

Holm's eight books have won scholarly acclaim and recognition with four Washington State Governor's Writers Awards, and two special Governor's awards.

In 2001, Holm was honored with a certificate of appreciation from the Tlingit, Haida, and Tsimshian people of Southeast Alaska through the Sealaska Heritage Institute. The Native American Art Studies Association recognized him with its Honor Award in 1991. The University of Washington honored him with a Distinguished Achievement Award from the College of Arts and Sciences in 1994 and selected him to give the annual University Faculty Lecture in 2003. He also received the Burke award for courage, excellence and bravery in 2010.

Visual art 
A series of large paintings by Holm introduced Northwest Native motifs in the gallery of Northwest Coast art at the 1962 Seattle World's Fair in the Century 21 Exposition. His work is cataloged in the 2000 book, Sun Dogs and Eagle Down, The Indian Paintings of Bill Holm.

Bibliography 
 (1965) Northwest Coast Indian Art, An Analysis of Form. University of Washington Press, Seattle.
 (1972) Crooked Beak of Heaven. Index of Art in the Pacific Northwest, No. 3, University of Washington Press, Seattle.
 (1975) Form and Freedom: A Dialogue on Northwest Coast Indian Art (with Bill Reid). Institute for the Arts, Rice University, Houston.
 (1976) Indian Art of the Northwest Coast: A Dialogue on Craftsmanship and Aesthetics.(republication of Form and Freedom) University of Washington Press, Seattle.
 (1980) Edward S. Curtis in the Land of the War Canoes: A Pioneer Cinematographer in the Pacific Northwest. (with George I. Quimby) University of Washington Press, Seattle.
 (1982) Soft Gold: The Fur Trade and Cultural Exchange on the Northwest Coast of America. (with Thomas Vaughan). Oregon Historical Society, Portland.
 (1983) Smoky-Top: The Art and Times of Willie Seaweed. University of Washington Press, Seattle.
 (1983) The Box of Daylight: Northwest Coast Indian Art. Seattle Art Museum and University of Washington Press, Seattle.
 (1987) Spirit and Ancestor: a Century of Northwest Coast Art in the Burke Museum. University of Washington Press.
 (2000) Sundogs and Eagle Down: the Indian Paintings of Bill Holm, by Stephen C. Brown and Lloyd J. Averill. University of Washington Press.

Filmography 
 (1973) The Kwakiutl of British Columbia. A film made in 1930 by Franz Boas. Edited and with notes by Bill Holm. University of Washington Press, Seattle.
 (1973) In the Land of the War Canoes. A film made in 1914 by Edward S. Curtis. Edited and with sound track directed by Bill Holm. University of Washington Press, Seattle.
 (1980) The Image Maker and the Indian. (with George I.Quimby) University of Washington Press, Seattle.

References

External links

 Complete list of publications
Bill Holm Center at the Burke Museum
 Camp Nor'wester

1925 births
2020 deaths
American art historians
Artists from Montana
People from Roundup, Montana
Pacific Northwest artists
Northwest Coast art
University of Washington faculty
Historians of the Pacific Northwest
Historians from Montana